Lancelot Rolleston (20 July 1785 – 18 May 1862) was a British Conservative Party politician.

He was elected unopposed as a Member of Parliament (MP) for Southern division of Nottinghamshire at the 1837 general election. He was re-elected unopposed in 1841 and 1847, and resigned from the House of Commons in 1849 by the procedural device of accepting the post of Steward of the Chiltern Hundreds.

His daughter Charlotte Frances Anne Rolleston (died January 1853) was married on 11 April 1840 to the Whig politician George Heneage.

References

External links 

1785 births
1862 deaths
Conservative Party (UK) MPs for English constituencies
UK MPs 1837–1841
UK MPs 1841–1847
UK MPs 1847–1852